Hold My Heart is a 2002 Norwegian drama film directed by Trygve Allister Diesen. It was selected as the Norwegian entry for the Best Foreign Language Film at the 75th Academy Awards, but it was not nominated.

Cast
 Jørgen Langhelle as Harald Gran
 Vera Rudi as Lise Lunde
 Andrea Bræin Hovig as Cecilie Lunde
 Kari Simonsen as Gerd Lunde
 Ingjerd Egeberg as Toril Houg

See also
 List of submissions to the 75th Academy Awards for Best Foreign Language Film
 List of Norwegian submissions for the Academy Award for Best Foreign Language Film

References

External links
 

2002 films
2002 drama films
Norwegian drama films
2000s Norwegian-language films